The FIS Nordic World Ski Championships 1974 took place 16–24 February 1974 in Falun, Sweden. This was the second time this city hosted the event having done so in 1954. The women's 3 × 5 km relay changed to a 4 × 5 km relay at these championships. Magne Myrmo's gold medal in the 15 km race, was the last international cross-country championship medal won using wooden skis. Two years later, at the 1976 Winter Olympics, all competitors used skis made of fiberglass.

Men's cross-country

15 km 
19 February 1974

30 km 
17 February 1974

50 km 
24 February 1974

4 × 10 km relay
21 February 1974

Women's cross-country

5 km 
18 February 1974

10 km 
20 February 1974

4 × 5 km relay
23 February 1974

Men's Nordic combined

Individual 
17–18 February 1974

Men's ski jumping

Individual normal hill 
16 February 1974

Individual large hill 
23 February 1974

Medal table

References

FIS 1974 Cross country results
FIS 1974 Nordic combined results
FIS 1974 Ski jumping results
Results from German Wikipedia

External links
The event at SVT's open archive 

FIS Nordic World Ski Championships
Nordic Skiing
1974 in Nordic combined
1974 in Swedish sport
February 1974 sports events in Europe
Nordic skiing competitions in Sweden
Sports competitions in Falun